The Vaud Alps are a mountain range of the Western Alps, located in western Switzerland. They are sometimes also referred to as the western Bernese Limestone Alps and as an extension of the Bernese Alps. According to SOIUSA, they are thus the western subsection 12.III according to SOIUSA of the Bernese Alps in the wide meaning.

The highest peak is Le Sommet des Diablerets, 3210 m above sea level. In the alpine guides of the Swiss Alpine Club, they are summarized with the Vaudois pre-Alps.

List of peaks 

The chief peaks of the Vaud Alps are:

References 

Landforms of Valais
Landforms of the canton of Vaud
Mountain ranges of Switzerland
Mountain ranges of the Alps